Fletcher or Fletcher Lake is an unincorporated community in Wayne Township, Fulton County, Indiana.

History
A post office was established at Fletcher in 1888, and remained in operation until it was discontinued in 1904. The name of the community honors John Fletcher, a pioneer settler.

Geography

References

Unincorporated communities in Fulton County, Indiana
Unincorporated communities in Indiana